Idra Novey is an American novelist, poet, and translator. She translates from Portuguese, Spanish, and Persian and now lives in Brooklyn, New York.

Career 
Idra Novey is a novelist, poet, and translator. She is the author of the novels Ways to Disappear (2016) and Those Who Knew (2018), which received the 2017 Sami Rohr Prize, the 2016 Brooklyn Eagles Prize, and was a finalist for the L.A. Times Book Prize for First Fiction. Those Who Knew was also a finalist for the 2019 Clark Fiction Prize, a New York Times Editors’ Choice, and a Best Book of the Year with over a dozen media outlets, including NPR, Esquire, BBC, Kirkus Review, and O Magazine. Her poetry collections include Exit, Civilian (2011), selected for the 2011 National Poetry Series, The Next Country (2008), a finalist for the 2008 Foreword Book of the Year Award, and Clarice: The Visitor, a collaboration with the artist Erica Baum. Her fiction and poetry have been translated into a dozen languages and she’s written for The New York Times, The Los Angeles Times, New York Magazine, and The Paris Review. She is the recipient of awards from the National Endowment for the Arts, Poets & Writ­ers Mag­a­zine, the PEN Translation Fund, the Poetry Foundation, and The Pushcart Prize. Her works as a translator include Clarice Lispector’s novel The Passion According to G.H. and a co-translation with Ahmad Nadalizadeh of Iranian poet Garous Abdolmalekian, Lean Against This Late Hour, a finalist for the PEN America Poetry in Translation Prize in 2021. She teaches fiction in the MFA Program at NYU and at Princeton University.

She is the most recent translator of The Passion According to G.H. by Clarice Lispector, On Elegance While Sleeping by Viscount Lascano Tegui, Birds for a Demolition by Manoel de Barros, and The Clean Shirt of It by Paulo Henriques Britto. With Ahmad Nadalizadeh, she has co-translated from Persian a collection of Iranian poet Garous Abdolmalekian, entitled Lean Against This Late Hour (2020).

Her fiction and poetry have been translated into ten languages, and she has received awards from Poets & Writers, the Poetry Foundation, the Brooklyn Eagles Literary Prize, and the National Endowment of the Arts.

Personal Life 
Idra grew up in Johnstown, Pennsylvania, one of four siblings. She graduated from Barnard College and from Columbia University. She lives with her family in Brooklyn, New York.

Published works

Novels
 Those Who Knew (Viking Books, 2018) 
 Ways to Disappear (Little, Brown & Company, 2016)

Full-length poetry collections
 
 The Next Country Alice James Books, 2008. ,

Chapbooks
 The Next Country (Poetry Society of America, 2005)

Translations
 Dark Period, by Garous Abdolmalekian in New York Times Magazine, co-translated with Ahmad Nadalizadeh.
 Oh! by Luis Muñoz for Poem-a-Day, co-translated with Garth Greenwell.
 Lean Against This Late Hour, by Garous Abdolmalekian, co-translated with Ahmad Nadalizadeh, Penguin Press, 2020. 
 The Passion According to G.H., by Clarice Lispector New Directions, 2012; Penguin Modern Classics, 2014. , 
 On Elegance While Sleeping, by Emilio Lascano Tegui (Dalkey Archive, 2010. , 
 Birds for a Demolition, by Manoel de Barros Carnegie Mellon University Press, 2010. , 
 The Clean Shirt of It, by Paulo Henriques Britto BOA Editions, Ltd., 2007. ,

Short stories
 "The Glacier" (The Yale Review, Summer 2021, winner of a 2022 Pushcart Prize)
 "Harmony, Interrupted" (The Chronicles of Now, 2020)
 "Husband and Wife During the Nightly News" (The Yale Review, Winter 2019)
 "The Man from the Ad" (Guernica Magazine, 2011)
 "The Specialist" (StoryQuarterly, 2015)
"Under the Lid" (The American Scholar, 2016)

Selected poems
"Night Sky with Blue Silo and a Bonfire" (A Public Space, 2022)
"Nearly" (Poets.org, 2019)
"Still Life With Invisible Canoe" (Academy of American Poets, 2015)
 "On Returning to My Hometown in 2035" (Poetry Foundation, 2014)
 "The Duck Shit at Clarion Creek" (Poetry Foundation, 2014)
 "House-Sitting With Approaching Fire" (Guernica Magazine, 2014)
 "The Visitor" (Poetry Foundation, 2012)
 "La Prima Victoria" (Poetry Foundation, 2012)

Nonfiction
"‘Change Your Life,’ the Poet Says, and a Rural Idyll Offers a Tantalizing Choice," The New York Times

Honors and awards
 2022 Pushcart Prize for "The Glacier," Yale Review
 2017 Sami Rohr Prize, for Ways to Disappear
 2016 Brooklyn Eagles Literary Prize, for Ways to Disappear
 2016 Los Angeles Times Book Prize for First Fiction (finalist), for Ways to Disappear
 2016 Discover Great New Writers Pick, Barnes & Noble, for Ways to Disappear
 2011 National Poetry Series, for Exit, Civilian
 2011 Best Translated Book Award (shortlisted), for On Elegance While Sleeping
 2009 NEA Literature Fellowship for Translation
 2007 Kinereth Gensler Award, for The Next Country
 2007 PEN Translation Fund Grant from PEN American Center, for The Clean Shirt of It
 2005 Poetry Society of America Chapbook Series Fellowship, for The Next Country

References

External links.
 Official website: www.idranovey.com

21st-century American poets
Living people
Poets from New York (state)
National Endowment for the Arts Fellows
American women poets
Princeton University faculty
New York University faculty
Columbia University faculty
21st-century American women writers
21st-century American translators
Translators from Persian
Translators from Portuguese
Translators of Clarice Lispector
Translators from Spanish
Chapbook writers
Barnard College alumni
Columbia University alumni
Date of birth missing (living people)
Year of birth missing (living people)
American women academics
21st-century pseudonymous writers
Pseudonymous women writers